Custalogas Town is a ghost town in Coshocton County, in the U.S. state of Ohio.

History
The town was named for Custoga, a Delaware Indian who probably once lived here.

References

Geography of Coshocton County, Ohio
Unincorporated communities in Coshocton County, Ohio
Ghost towns in Ohio